This is a list of fellows of the Royal Society elected in 1698.

Fellows 
Balthasar Becker  (1634–1698)
Sir Orlando Bridgeman  (1649–1701)
Giorgio Baglivi  (1668–1707)
Edward Haistwell  (1658–1709)
Domenico Guglielmini  (1655–1710)
John Somers Baron Somers of Evesham (1650–1716)
Maurice Emmet  (1676–1720)
Matthew Prior  (1664–1721)
Charles Spencer 3rd Earl of Sunderland (1674–1722)
Robert Molesworth 1st Viscount Molesworth and Baron Molesworth (1656–1725)
Edward Norris  (1663–1726)
James Ogilvy 1st Earl of Seafield and 4th Earl of Findlater (1663–1730)
Etienne Francois Geoffroy  (1672–1731)
Thomas Isted  (1677–1731)
John Fryer  (1650–1733)
Anthony Hammond  (1668–1739)
Sir John Stanley  (1663–1744)
George Mackay 3rd Lord Reay (1678–1748)
Jacques Cassini  (1677–1756)
Sir Berkeley Lucy  (1672–1759)

References

1698
1698 in science
1698 in England